Patrick Onyango Sumba (July 22, 1948 - October 12, 2009) was a Kenyan triple jumper and journalist who competed for Kenya at the 1972 Summer Olympics in Munich in the triple jump event.

References

1948 births
2009 deaths
Kenyan male triple jumpers
Kenyan male long jumpers
Olympic athletes of Kenya
Athletes (track and field) at the 1970 British Commonwealth Games
Athletes (track and field) at the 1972 Summer Olympics
Commonwealth Games competitors for Kenya